Robert Pennock may refer to:

 Robert Pennock (politician) (1936–2019), Canadian politician
 Robert T. Pennock, philosopher